The Jammu & Kashmir Human Rights Commission was an autonomous state body with quasi-judicial powers tasked to investigate any violation of human rights in Jammu and Kashmir, India. The body was constituted in January 1997 by the National Conference government under the Protection of Human Rights Act. The commission consists of a chairman and four other members.

Officially, cases from the Jammu and Kashmir Human Rights Commission went to the National Human Rights Commission of India.

See also 

 National Human Rights Commission of India

References

State agencies of Jammu and Kashmir
1997 establishments in Jammu and Kashmir
Human rights abuses in Jammu and Kashmir
Human rights in India